David John Heyes (born 7 February 1967) is a former English cricketer.  Heyes was a right-handed batsman who bowled right-arm medium pace.  He was born at Prescot, Lancashire.

Heyes represented the Lancashire Cricket Board in 3 List A matches.  These came against the Netherlands in the 1999 NatWest Trophy and Suffolk and the Essex Cricket Board in the 2000 NatWest Trophy.  In his 3 List A matches, he scored 41 runs at a batting average of 13.66, with a high score of 27.  In the field he took a single catch.

In 2003, he played a single Minor Counties Championship match for Cumberland against Hertfordshire.

References

External links
David Heyes at Cricinfo
David Heyes at CricketArchive

1967 births
Living people
Sportspeople from Prescot
English cricketers
Lancashire Cricket Board cricketers
Cumberland cricketers